Phuphkalan (a.k.a. Phoop) is a town and a nagar panchayat in Bhind district in the Indian state of Madhya Pradesh. The town is named after Phoopti Mata whose ancient temple is situated there. It is a group of five small units: Lohriphoop, Andhapura, Badiphoop, Kasapura, and Kariyapura.

Demographics
 India census, Phuphkalan had a population of 10,245. Males constitute 55% of the population and females 45%. Phuphkalan has an average literacy rate of 61%, higher than the national average of 59.5%: male literacy is 70%, and female literacy is 50%. In Phuphkalan, 17% of the population is under 6 years of age.

References

Cities and towns in Bhind district